Balash (Middle Persian: 𐭥𐭥𐭣𐭠𐭧𐭱𐭩) was the Sasanian King of Kings of Iran from 484 to 488. He was the brother and successor of Peroz I, who had been defeated and killed by a Hephthalite army.

Name 
Balāsh is the New Persian form of the Middle Persian Wardākhsh/Walākhsh (Inscriptional Pahlavi:  wrdʾḥšy; late Book Pahlavi forms gwlḥš- Gulakhsh- and Gulāsh-). The etymology of the name is unclear, although Ferdinand Justi proposes that Walagaš, the first form of the name, is a compound of words "strength" (varəda), and "handsome" (gaš or geš in Modern Persian).

The Greek forms of his name are Blases and Balas.

Reign 
In 484, Peroz I was defeated and killed by a Hephthalite army near Balkh. His army was completely destroyed, and his body was never found. Four of his sons and brothers had also died. The main Sasanian cities of the eastern region of Khorasan−Nishapur, Herat and Marw were now under Hephthalite rule. Sukhra, a member of the Parthian House of Karen, one of the Seven Great Houses of Iran, quickly raised a new force and stopped the Hephthalites from achieving further success. Peroz' brother, Balash, was elected as shah by the Iranian magnates, most notably Sukhra and the Mihranid general Shapur Mihran.

Immediately after ascending the throne, Balash sought peace with the Hephthalites, which cost the Sasanians a heavy tribute. Little is known about Balash, but he is perceived by eastern sources as a mild and tolerant ruler. He was very tolerant of Christianity, which earned him a reputation among Christian authors, who described him as a mild and generous monarch. Nevertheless, it would seem that Balash was only a nominee of the powerful nobleman and de facto ruler Sukhra.

At the announcement of the death of Peroz, the Iranian nobles of Sasanian Armenia, including the prominent nobleman Shapur Mihran, had become eager to go to the Sasanian capital of Ctesiphon to elect a new sovereign. This had allowed the Armenians under Vahan Mamikonian to proclaim independence from the Sasanians. Given the situation of the weakness in Iran, Balash did not send an army to fight the rebels, which forced him to conclude peace with the Armenians. The conditions of the peace were: all existing fire-altars in Armenia should be destroyed and no new ones should be constructed; Christians in Armenia should have freedom of worship and conversions to Zoroastrianism should be stopped: land should not be allotted to people who convert to Zoroastrianism; the Iranian shah should, in person, administer Armenia and through the aid of governors or deputies. In 485, Balash appointed Vahan Mamikonian as the marzban of Armenia. A few months later, a son of Peroz named Zarer rose in rebellion. Balash, with the aid of the Armenians, put down the rebellion, captured and killed him. In 488, Balash, who was an unpopular figure among the nobility and clergy, was deposed after a reign of just four years. Sukhra played a main role in Balash's deposition, and appointed Peroz's son Kavad as the new shah of Iran.

Notes

References

Sources
 
 

 
 
 
 
 
 
 
 

5th-century Sasanian monarchs
Shahnameh characters
5th-century births
Year of death unknown